HC Slavia Praha (eng: HC Slavia Prague) is a Czech ice hockey team located in Prague playing the Czech 1st National Hockey League, the second-highest league in the country. Slavia played in the Extraliga from 1994 until 2015, winning the national championship in 2003 and 2008. The club plays its home games at Zimní stadion Eden in Prague. From 2004 until 2015, it played at O2 Arena.

The team played in the 2008–09 season of the Champions Hockey League.

The team was relegated to the 1. Liga in the 2014–15 Czech Extraliga season.

Players

World champions and Olympic champions
Jan Fleischmann (ME 1911, 1914)
Miloslav Fleischmann (ME 1911, 1922)
J. Jarkovský (ME 1911)
Jaroslav Jirkovský (ME 1911, 1914, 1922, 1925)
Tomáš Kucharčík (MS 1999)
Josef Loos (ME 1914)
Vilém Loos (ME 1922, 1925)
Jan Palouš (ME 1911, 1914)
František Rublič (ME 1914)
Vladimír Růžička (WOG 1998; MS 2005, 2010 as Head coach)
Bohumil Steingenhöfer (ME 1929)
Jaroslav Špaček (MS 2005)
Josef Šroubek (ME 1925, 1929)
Viktor Ujčík (MS 1996, 2001)
Josef Vašíček (MS 2005)
Otakar Vindyš (ME 1911, 1922, 1925)
Tomáš Vlasák (MS 1999, 2000, 2001)

Honours
Czech Extraliga championships: 2 (2003, 2008)

References

External links

  HC Slavia Praha official homepage
  HC Slavia Praha FanClub homepage

Slavia Praha
Praha, Slavia
Slavia HC
SK Slavia Prague
Ice hockey clubs established in 1900
1900 establishments in Austria-Hungary
19th-century establishments in Bohemia